Bowes railway station was situated on the South Durham & Lancashire Union Railway between Barnard Castle and Kirkby Stephen East.

History
The line was opened on 26 March 1861 when a mineral train was run, the line opened to passengers on 8 August 1861 following an opening ceremony the day before.

The station served the village of Bowes. The station was host to a camping coach in 1933 and from 1937 to 1939 and possibly also in 1934.

The station was closed by British Railways North Eastern Region on 22 January 1962.

The site today
The station buildings are now (2008) in an extreme state of dereliction. A large farm shed covers a portion of the platforms and yard.

The signal box, which for many years after closure was hidden away inside the farm shed, was dismantled and is in storage.

The trackbed westwards of the station (towards Stainmore Summit) is covered by the re-aligned A66 road.

Images

References

Bibliography

Further reading

External links
Gallery of photos of Bowes station in its current state
More photos of Bowes station, past & present
Photos of Bowes station in 1973

South Durham and Lancashire Union Railway
Disused railway stations in County Durham
Former North Eastern Railway (UK) stations
Railway stations in Great Britain opened in 1861
Railway stations in Great Britain closed in 1962
Ruins in County Durham
1861 establishments in England
Bowes